is a private university junior college headquartered in Japan 4-16-1 Gojo Dazaifu, Fukuoka Prefecture. It was established in 1966. There is no relationship between the corporation and another similar names Fukuoka Women's University.

External links
 Fukuoka Women's Junior College

Educational institutions established in 1966
Japanese junior colleges
1966 establishments in Japan
Universities and colleges in Fukuoka Prefecture